Heeren is a Dutch and Low German patronymic surname. The now rare given name Heer, Heere or Here is a short form of names containing the Germanic root -her- ("army"), like Herman and Herbert. People with this surname include:

Arnold Hermann Ludwig Heeren (1760–1842), German historian
Cor Heeren (1900–1976), Dutch racing cyclist
Friedrich Heeren (1803–1885), German chemist
Henri Heeren (born 1974), Dutch footballer
 (born 1967), Dutch duathete and triathlete
Paul Heeren (born 1954), Australian guitarist and songwriter
Variants
Achille Vander Heeren (1880–1956), Belgian Catholic biblical scholar
Aimée de Heeren (1903–2006), Brazilian socialite, wife of Rodman Heeren

See also
De Heer, Dutch surname

References

Dutch-language surnames
Patronymic surnames